Docosatetraenoic acid designates any straight chain 22:4 fatty acid. (See essential fatty acid for nomenclature.)

One isomer is of particular interest:
 all-cis-7,10,13,16-docosatetraenoic acid is an ω-6 fatty acid with the common name adrenic acid (AdA). This is a naturally occurring polyunsaturated fatty acid formed through a 2-carbon chain elongation of arachidonic acid.  It is one of the most abundant fatty acids in the early human brain. This unsaturated fatty acid is also metabolized by cells to biologically active products viz., dihomoprostaglandins, and epoxydocosatrienoic acids (EDTs, also known as dihomo-EETs).   In addition to being endothelium-derived hyperpolarizing factors, EDTs have demonstrated anti-endoplasmic reticulum stress and anti-nociceptive activities. They are hydrolyzed by the soluble epoxide hydrolase (sEH) to dihydroxydocosatrienoic acids (DHDTs) and hence might play a role in the efficacy of sEH inhibitors.

See also
Polyunsaturated fatty acids
Docosanoid#DTA-derived docosanoids

References

Further reading
Ferretti, A., Flanagan, V.P. Mass spectrometric evidence for the conversion of exogenous adrenate to dihomo-prostaglandins by seminal vesicle cyclo-oxygenase. A comparative study of two animal species. J Chromatogr 383 241-250 (1986).
Sprecher, H., VanRollins, M., Sun, F., et al. Dihomo-prostaglandins and -thromboxane. A prostaglandin family from adrenic acid that may be preferentially synthesized in the kidney. J Biol Chem 257 3912-3918 (1982).

Fatty acids
Alkenoic acids